Events in the year 2019 in Malta.

Incumbents
 President:
 Marie-Louise Coleiro Preca (to 4 April)
 George Vella (from 4 April) 
 Prime Minister: Joseph Muscat

Year

References

 
2010s in Malta
Years of the 21st century in Malta
Malta
Malta